Nokes is a surname. Notable people with the surname include:

Caroline Nokes (born 1972), British politician
David Nokes (1948–2009), English literature scholar
Emily Nokes, American writer, artist, music critic and musician
Ethel Nokes (1883–1976), British children's writer
James Nokes (died c.1692), English actor
Malcolm Nokes (1897–1986), British schoolteacher, soldier, research scientist and Olympic athlete
Matt Nokes (born 1963), American baseball player
Rhian Nokes (born 1989), Welsh footballer and rugby player
Roger Nokes (born 1958), New Zealand professor of engineering

See also
Noakes (disambiguation)
Noke (disambiguation)
Sodium dithiophosphate, aka Nokes' reagent